The Inkerman Sugar Mill is located in Home Hill, Queensland on the banks of the Burdekin River. The mill was designed and built by the Scottish engineer J Pickering under the instruction of John Drysdale, using machinery manufactured by Geo Fletcher and Company of Derby, England. It was completed in 1914 and began crushing the following year.

From March 2010, it is operated by Wilmar Sugar Australia Pty Ltd. Before that it was operated by CSR Limited.

See also
 List of sugar mills in Queensland
 List of tramways in Queensland

References

Buildings and structures in North Queensland
Food and drink companies established in 1914
Sugar companies of Australia
Sugar mills in Queensland
Australian companies established in 1914
Home Hill, Queensland